Live! is a 2005 live album by fusion / jazz guitarist Scott Henderson. It's a double-CD, recorded at the La Vee club in Los Angeles, mixed by Michael Landau.
The album features live-versions of songs from Henderson's previous solo-releases and songs by his fusion-band Tribal Tech

Track listing
CD1:
"Slidin'" – 7:27
"Well To The Bone" – 4:08
"Sultan's Boogie" – 7:26
"Xanax" – 6:25
"Lady P" – 7:55
"Jakarta" – 7:26
"Tacos Are Good" – 5:38

CD2:
"Dog Party" – 9:20
"Fee Fi Fo Fum" – 8:58
"Meter Maid" – 4:52
"Nairobe Express" – 12:27
"Devil Boy" – 7:51
"Hillbilly In The Band" – 6:17

Personnel
 Scott Henderson - Guitars
 Kirk Covington - Drums and vocals
 John Humphrey - Bass

Albums produced by Mike Varney
Albums produced by Scott Henderson
Live blues albums
Live jazz fusion albums
2005 live albums
Scott Henderson albums